Almost 50 different players participated for Montenegro men's national handball team from 2007 until today. Among former players of Montenegro, there are Alen Muratović, Petar Kapisoda, Draško Mrvaljević, Goran Đukanović, Vladimir Osmajić, Goran Stojanović, Blažo Lisičić, Marko Dobrković and others.

Most matches for Montenegrin national team played Igor Marković, Zoran Roganović and Mladen Rakčević. Most goals for Montenegrin national team scored Draško Mrvaljević, Zoran Roganović and Mladen Rakčević.

Majority of players who represented Montenegrin national team were born in Cetinje and during their youth played for the most successful Montenegrin club RK Lovćen.

Performance in the Montenegro national team

Below is the list of all players which participated in the Montenegrin national handball team. Data is only for official matches (qualifiers, European Championship, World Championship). For more information, there is a List of official matches of the Montenegro handball team.

Coaching history* Data is only for official matches (qualifiers, European Championship, World Championship). For more information, there is a List of official matches of the Montenegro handball team''

See also 
 Montenegro men's national handball team
 List of official matches of the Montenegro handball team
 Handball Federation of Montenegro
 Montenegro women's national handball team

Handball in Montenegro
Montenegro
Handball